Əvçədulan (also, Avchadulan) is a village and municipality in the Yardymli Rayon of Azerbaijan.  It has a population of 409.  The municipality consists of the villages of Əvçədulan and Keçələkəran.

References 

Populated places in Yardimli District